Paul Frédéric Girard (23 March 1852, Paris – 1 July 1922, Paris) was a French Hellenist, archaeologist and epigrapher.

Biography 
A student of the École Normale Supérieure, he obtained his agrégation de lettres in 1875. A member of the French School at Athens from 1875 to 1879, he directed the excavations of the Heraion of Samos and purchased the Hera for the Louvre museum (1879).

A lecturer at the Faculty of Letters of Toulouse (1881), he provided a Greek language and literature lecture at the École Normale Supérieure from 1893 to 1903. He held the chair of Greek language and literature at the Sorbonne from 1904 to 1922.

He was elected a member of the Académie des Inscriptions et Belles-Lettres in 1908.

Works 
1881: L'Asclépeion d'Athènes d'après les récentes découvertes
1889: L'éducation athénienne au Ve et au IVe siècle avant J.-C, Hachette
1892: La Peinture antique on Gallica
1895: La coutume à Rome, Textes de droit romain,
1914: Alphonse Ducatel, professeur au lycée Condorcet (10 février 1851-11 décembre 1913), Belin
1917: Séance publique annuelle de l'Académie des inscriptions et belles-lettres, Firmin-Didot

Bibliography 
 P. Monceaux, Éloge funèbre de M. Paul Girard, Comptes rendus de l'Académie des inscriptions et belles-lettres, 1922. Read online on Persée.fr.
 H. Goelzer, Notice sur la vie et les travaux de M. Paul Girard, Institut de France, 1923
 J. Toutain, Notice nécrologique, in Bulletin de la Société nationale des antiquaires de France, 1923
 Ève Gran-Aymerich, Les chercheurs de passé, Éditions du CNRS, 2007, p. 831 

Archaeologists from Paris
French hellenists
French epigraphers
École Normale Supérieure alumni
Members of the French School at Athens
Members of the Académie des Inscriptions et Belles-Lettres
1852 births
1922 deaths